The 2017–18 Wyoming Cowgirls basketball team represent the University of Wyoming in the 2016–17 college basketball season. The Cowgirls are led by fifteenth year head coach Joe Legerski. The Cowgirls played their home games at the Arena-Auditorium and are members of the Mountain West Conference. They Finished the season 22-11, 13-5 in Mountain West play to finish in third place. They lost in the semifinals of the Mountain West tournament to Nevada. They were invited to the 2018 Women's National Invitation Tournament  where they won in the first round against New Mexico State, but lost in the second round.

Roster

Statistics

Schedule

|-
!colspan=9 style="background:#492f24; color:#ffc425;"| Exhibition

|-
!colspan=9 style="background:#492f24; color:#ffc425;"| Non-conference regular season

|-

|-

|-

|-

|-

|-

|-

|-

|-

|-

|-
!colspan=9 style="background:#492f24; color:#ffc425;"| Mountain West regular season

|-

|-

|-

|-

|-

|-

|-

|-

|-

|-

|-

|-

|-

|-

|-

|-

|-

|-
!colspan=9 style="background:#492f24; color:#ffc425;"| Mountain West Women's Tournament

|-
!colspan=9 style="background:#492f24; color:#ffc425;"|WNIT

See also
 2017–18 Wyoming Cowboys basketball team

References

Wyoming Cowgirls basketball seasons
Wyoming
Wyoming Cowgirls
Wyoming Cowgirls
Wyoming